Jōtarō is a male Japanese given name.

People 
, Japanese politician and entrepreneur
 Jōtarō Kawakami, Japanese socialist politician
 Jotaro Saito, Japanese kimono designer
 Jotaro Senba (born 1937), Japanese actor
, Japanese General in the second World War

Characters 
, a character in Black Jack
, a character in JoJo's Bizarre Adventure and the main protagonist of the third part, Stardust Crusaders
 Jotaro Nagao, a character in Ring
 Jotaro (Usagi Yojimbo), a character in Usagi Yojimbo
 Jotaro, a character in Musashi
 (aka "Bleed Kaga"), a character in Future GPX Cyber Formula
, a character from Government Crime Investigation Agent Zaizen Jotaro
Jotaro Shobo, a minor character in Cyberpunk 2077

Japanese masculine given names